Lawrence R. Douglas (born 1959) is the James J. Grosfeld Professor of Law, Jurisprudence, and Social Thought at Amherst College in Amherst, Massachusetts. He is also an author of both fiction and nonfiction.

Education
Douglas received his A.B. from Brown University in 1982, his A.M. from Columbia University in 1986, and his J.D. from Yale Law School in 1989.

Career 
Douglas is both a fiction and nonfiction author. Much of Douglas's nonfiction has focused on legal responses to state-sponsored atrocities. His two novels have focused on the question of Jewish identity. 

In 2013, Douglas wrote about Guantánamo detainee Abd al-Nashiri for Harper's Magazine. Douglas is also a regular reviewer of books on legal topics for the Times Literary Supplement and a regular contributor to The Guardian.

Douglas is the recipient of fellowships from the National Endowment of the Humanities, the American Council of Learned Societies, the United States Holocaust Memorial Museum, the Institute for International Education, and the Carnegie Corporation. He has served as a visiting professor of law at the University of London and at Humboldt Universität, Berlin.

Works

Editor

Novels

Awards 
The Catastrophist was named a best book of 2006 by Kirkus Reviews and received the 2006 Silver Prize in General Fiction at the Independent Publishers' Book Awards. 

The Vices was named a best book of 2011 by New York Magazine and the New Statesman, and it was a finalist for the 2011 National Jewish Book Award. 

The Right Wrong Man: John Demjanjuk and the Last Great Nazi War Crimes Trial was named a New York Times Editors' Choice for 2016.

References

External links
 Judging the Courts: Wikinews interviews Prof. Lawrence Douglas.
 Faculty site at Amherst College.
 Lawrence Douglas in "The Accountant of Auschwitz."
 Lawrence Douglas's Op-Eds in The Guardian.

1959 births
Living people
Brown University alumni
Columbia University alumni
Yale Law School alumni
American legal scholars
Amherst College faculty